Barkweda  is a village in the administrative district of Gmina Dywity, within Olsztyn County, Warmian-Masurian Voivodeship, in northern Poland. It is located on the Łyna River and Lake Mosąg in Warmia.

References

Populated lakeshore places in Poland
Villages in Olsztyn County